Stage One is a 2000 album by Sean Paul.

Stage One may also refer to:
Stage-one cancer
Stage One in Demographic transition
Stage One International Film Festival

Studios
Stage One, Old Warner Brothers Studio
20th Century Fox Stage One, where A Date with Elvis and other Elvis Presley shows recorded
Stage One, Studio Tour
Stage One Studio of Andy Classen 
Stage One Theatre Brisbane, The Little Dog Laughed
Stage One (formerly Theatre Investment Fund), Thelma Holt of the National Theatre

Stage One, Chabot College Theater Department